John Obert Voll is an American scholar of Islam and Professor Emeritus of Islamic History at Georgetown University in Washington, DC.

Biography
After graduating from Dartmouth College, Voll earned a master's degree in Middle Eastern studies and a doctorate in history and Middle Eastern studies from Harvard University. Before coming to Georgetown, he spent thirty years teaching Middle Eastern and international history at the University of New Hampshire. He has served as president of both the Middle East Studies Association and the New England Historical Association. 
Voll has served on the boards of directors of the American Council of Learned Societies, the Sudan Studies Association, the World History Association, the New Hampshire Humanities Council, and the New Hampshire Council on World Affairs. He has lived in Sudan, Egypt, Lebanon, and Israel, and has conducted research on Islamic movements in Sub-Saharan Africa, East and Southeast Asia, and the Middle East.

Works
 Eightteenth Century Revival and Reform in Islam edited with Nehemia Levtzion
 Islam: Continuity and Change in the Modern World
 Islam and Democracy after the Arab Spring with John Esposito and Tamara Sonn
 Makers of Contemporary Islam with John Esposito
 Islam and Democracy with John L. Esposito
 Historical Dictionary of the Sudan with Carolyn Fluehr-Lobban and Richard Lobban
 The Sudan: Unity and Diversity in a Multicultural Society with Sarah Potts Voll

References

American historians of Islam
Year of birth missing (living people)
Living people
Dartmouth College alumni
Harvard University alumni
University of New Hampshire faculty
Georgetown University faculty